Tears is an EP by The Crüxshadows released in 2001 on Dancing Ferret Discs. The album contains the eponymous single from the band's Wishfire album and an acoustic version of "Heaven's Gaze" from their 1999 album The Mystery of the Whisper.

Track listing
"Tears"
"Tears" (Apoptygma Berzerk remix)
"Within"
"Tears" (Robbie Tronco/Knobhead remix)
"Jabberwocky"
"Tears" (Fictional remix)
"Heaven's Gaze" (acoustic tears edit)

References

External links
Crüxshadows' official site

The Crüxshadows EPs
2001 EPs